Merve Uygül (born 30 September 1988) is a Turkish female basketball player. The  national plays Point guard.

Club career
On 8 August 2022, she signed with Galatasaray of the Turkish Women's Basketball Super League (TKBL).

References

External links
 MERVE UYGÜL at TBF.org.tr

1988 births
Living people
Turkish women's basketball players
Point guards
Basketball players from Istanbul
Galatasaray S.K. (women's basketball) players
Çankaya Üniversitesi SK players
Nesibe Aydın GSK players